Events from the year 1964 in Canada.

Incumbents

Crown 
 Monarch – Elizabeth II

Federal government 
 Governor General – Georges Vanier
 Prime Minister – Lester B. Pearson
 Chief Justice – Robert Taschereau (Quebec)
 Parliament – 26th

Provincial governments

Lieutenant governors 
Lieutenant Governor of Alberta – John Percy Page   
Lieutenant Governor of British Columbia – George Pearkes 
Lieutenant Governor of Manitoba – Errick Willis 
Lieutenant Governor of New Brunswick – Joseph Leonard O'Brien  
Lieutenant Governor of Newfoundland – Fabian O'Dea 
Lieutenant Governor of Nova Scotia – Henry Poole MacKeen  
Lieutenant Governor of Ontario – William Earl Rowe 
Lieutenant Governor of Prince Edward Island – Willibald Joseph MacDonald 
Lieutenant Governor of Quebec – Paul Comtois 
Lieutenant Governor of Saskatchewan – Robert Hanbidge

Premiers 
Premier of Alberta – Ernest Manning   
Premier of British Columbia – W.A.C. Bennett 
Premier of Manitoba – Dufferin Roblin  
Premier of New Brunswick – Louis Robichaud 
Premier of Newfoundland – Joey Smallwood 
Premier of Nova Scotia – Robert Stanfield 
Premier of Ontario – John Robarts 
Premier of Prince Edward Island – Walter Shaw 
Premier of Quebec – Jean Lesage  
Premier of Saskatchewan – Woodrow Lloyd (until May 2) then Ross Thatcher

Territorial governments

Commissioners 
 Commissioner of Yukon – Gordon Robertson Cameron  
 Commissioner of Northwest Territories – Bent Gestur Sivertz

Events
March 13 – Canada begins a decades-long peacekeeping mission in Cyprus
March 23 – George Stanley first describes and sketches the proposal for Canada's new flag that is eventually accepted
March 26 – The White Paper on Defence is tabled.
March 27 – Several towns in coastal British Columbia, including Prince Rupert, Tofino, Port Alberni and Zeballos, suffer damage from tsunamis associated with the Good Friday earthquake in Alaska. Overall damage is estimated at $10 million.
April – Canadians are issued Social Insurance cards for the first time
April 22 – Saskatchewan election: Ross Thatcher's Liberals win a majority, defeating Woodrow Lloyd's Co-operative Commonwealth Federation, ending almost 20 years of CCF rule over the province.
May 2 – W. Ross Thatcher is sworn in as Premier of Saskatchewan
May 27 – The Prime Minister unveils the "Pearson Pennant", his preferred, but ultimately unsuccessful, design for a new national flag.
June 15 – The Great Canadian Flag Debate begins in the House of Commons.
June 19 - The Hall Commission Report recommending the creation of Canada's medicare programme was tabled in the House of Commons. 
August 22 – The Beatles play at Empire Stadium in Vancouver, their first performance in Canada.
September 7 – The Beatles play at Maple Leaf Gardens in Toronto
September 8 – The Beatles play at the Montreal Forum
September 10 – After almost three months of debate in the Commons, the flag question is referred to an all-party committee.
September 17 – The flag committee meets for the first time.
October 5 – Elizabeth II and The Duke of Edinburgh begin an eight-day visit to Canada.
October 22 – The flag committee makes its final selection of the design that will become the national flag.
November 9 - Max Saltsman wins Waterloo South by-election, campaigning against a mere flag taking priority over important social issues such as medicare
November 30 – John Diefenbaker launches a filibuster to try to prevent the introduction of a new Canadian flag
December 16 – A resolution creating the new Flag of Canada is passed in the House of Commons after much controversy.

Full date unknown
Canada pulls its peacekeepers out of Zaire
Glenn Gould gives up doing live performances
Governor General Georges Vanier hosts the "Canadian Conference of the Family"
Innis College founded at the University of Toronto
 Canada passes act to change Air Canada's name.

Arts and literature

New books
Understanding Media: The Extensions of Man: Marshall McLuhan
The Circle Game: Margaret Atwood
The Laughing Rooster: Irving Layton
Flowers for Hitler: Leonard Cohen
The Stone Angel: Margaret Laurence

Awards
 See 1964 Governor General's Awards for a complete list of winners and finalists for those awards.
Stephen Leacock Award: Harry J. Boyle, Homebrew and Patches Clarke Irwin
Vicky Metcalf Award: John F. Hayes

Television
October 4 – The controversial news show This Hour Has Seven Days premieres on CBC.

Sport
March 14 – The Alberta Golden Bears win their first University Cup by defeating Sir George Williams Georgians 9 to 1. The final game was played at the Kingston Memorial Centre 
May 2 – Northern Dancer wins the Kentucky Derby.
Summer – At the Olympic Games held in Tokyo, Japan, Canada wins one gold medal.
April 25 – The Toronto Maple Leafs win their twelfth Stanley Cup by defeating the Detroit Red Wings 4 games to 3. The deciding Game 7 was played at Maple Leaf Gardens
November 28 – In a rematch of the 51st Grey Cup, the BC Lions win their first Grey Cup by defeating the Hamilton Tiger-Cats 34–24 in the 52nd Grey Cup at Toronto's Exhibition Stadium

Births

January to June
January 8 – Ron Sexsmith, singer-songwriter
January 10 – Brad Roberts, lead singer and guitarist
January 31 – Sylvie Bernier, diver and Olympic gold medallist
February 1 – Sharon Bruneau, bodybuilder and fitness competitor
February 10 
 Victor Davis, swimmer, Olympic gold medallist and World Champion (d.1989)
 Gregory Edgelow, wrestler
February 17 – Sherry Hawco, artistic gymnast (d. 1991)
April 1 – Scott Stevens, ice hockey player
April 7 – Steve Graves, ice hockey player
April 13 – Caroline Rhea, stand-up comedian and actress 
April 17 – Rachel Notley, politician and 17th Premier of Alberta
May 3 – Ron Hextall, ice hockey player 
May 13 – Robert Marland, rower and Olympic gold medallist
May 17 - Elfi Schlegel, gymnast
May 20 - Petr Kellner, entrepreneur (d. 2021)
May 24 – Clayton Gerein, Paralympic athlete
May 26 – Paul Okalik, politician and 1st Premier of Nunavut
June 9 – Gloria Reuben, singer and actress
June 14 – Randall Thompson, boxer
June 16 – Brad Fay, sportscaster
June 21 – Rick Duff, boxer
June 22 – Angelo Tsarouchas, comedian/actor
June 26 – Ian Tracey, actor
June 28 – Christina Ashcroft, sport shooter

July to December
July 24 - Stéphan Bureau, journalist, TV interviewer and producer
July 14 - Craig McKinley, physician and aquanaut (NEEMO 7 mission) (d. 2013)
July 24 – Erminia Russo, volleyball player
July 25 – Lisa LaFlamme, journalist and news anchor
August 6 – Alison Baker, racewalker
August 9 – Brett Hull, ice hockey player and coach
August 17 – Colin James, singer, guitarist and songwriter
August 26
 Dave Boyes, rower and Olympic silver medallist
 Bobby Jurasin, Canadian football defensive lineman
August 27 – Paul Bernardo, serial killer and rapist
August 30 – Milena Gaiga, field hockey player
September 1 – Brian Bellows, ice hockey player
September 2 – Keanu Reeves, actor
September 12 – Greg McConnell, indie rock musician (d. 1999)
September 14 – Terrence Paul, rower and Olympic gold medallist
September 18 – Kelly-Ann Way, track cyclist and road bicycle racer
September 22 – Wayne Yearwood, basketball player and coach
September 24 – That Vegan Teacher, activist, educator, and influencer
September 23 – Diana Dutra, female boxer
September 25 – Ray Lazdins, discus thrower
September 26 – Marc Lépine, mass murderer (d. 1989)

October 9 – John Ralston, actor
October 14 – David Kaye, actor and voice actor
October 23 – David Sobolov, voice actor and director
October 24
 Linda Ballantyne, voice actress 
 Paul Bonwick, Canadian House of Commons member
October 26 – Marc Lépine, murderer responsible for the École Polytechnique massacre (d. 1989)
October 29 – May Allison, long-distance runner
November 3 – Christian Mistral, Canadian novelist, poet, and songwriter (d. 2020) 
November 9 – Leah Pells, track and field athlete
November 10 – Stephen McNeil, politician and 28th Premier of Nova Scotia
November 14 – Silken Laumann, rower
November 15 – David Caplan, politician and Minister
November 16 – Diana Krall, jazz pianist and singer
December 11 – Carolyn Waldo, synchronized swimmer
December 19 – Lorie Kane, golfer
December 27 – Kevin Patterson, medical doctor and writer

Full date unknown
Gary Barwin, poet, author and musician
Maurice Vellekoop, artist and illustrator

Deaths
January 1 – William Herbert Burns, politician (b. 1878)
January 12 – Byron Ingemar Johnson, politician and 24th Premier of British Columbia (b. 1890)
February 18 – Joseph-Armand Bombardier, inventor, businessman and founder of Bombardier Inc. (b. 1907)
March 3 – Angus MacInnis, politician (b. 1884)
April 4 – Sarah Ramsland, politician, first woman elected to the Legislative Assembly of Saskatchewan (b. 1882)
April 20 – Joseph-Alphida Crete, politician (b. 1890)
April 26 – E. J. Pratt, poet (b. 1882)
June 9 – Max Aitken, 1st Baron Beaverbrook, business tycoon, politician and writer (b. 1879)
June 12 – Paul Carpenter, actor (b. 1921)
August 7 – Arsène Gagné, Quebec politician (b. 1910)
September 5 – William Sherring, marathon runner and Olympic gold medallist (b. 1878)
December 9 – Elmore Philpott, journalist and politician (b. 1896)
December 14 – Roland Beaudry, politician, journalist, publicist and publisher (b. 1906)

Full date unknown
Léo Gauthier, politician (b. 1904)

See also 
 1964 in Canadian television
 List of Canadian films

References 

 
Years of the 20th century in Canada
Canada
1964 in North America